Salemabad (also Romanized as Sālemābād; also known as Sālem Ābādeh, Salīm Ābād, and Salim Abadeh) is a village in Bu ol Kheyr Rural District, Delvar District, Tangestan County, Bushehr Province, Iran. At the 2006 census, its population was 455, in 108 families.

References 

Populated places in Tangestan County